The Internal Security Forces, also known as the Asayish in the Jazira, Euphrates, and Afrin Regions, is the police force of the autonomous regions of Rojava. Formed in the early stages of the Syrian Civil War, it had initially been established to police areas controlled by the Kurdish Supreme Committee. In October 2013, the Asayish claimed to have 4,000 members; by 2017, the number had reportedly risen to over 15,000.

Structure

Organization 
According to the Constitution of North and East Syria, policing is the responsibility of the autonomous sub-regions. Overall, the local Asayish forces are composed of 26 official bureaus that aim to provide security and solutions to social problems. The six main units of the Asayish are Checkpoints Administration, Anti-Terror Forces Command (HAT), Intelligence Directorate, Organized Crime Directorate, Traffic Directorate and Treasury Directorate. By 2016, 218 Asayish centers were established and 385 checkpoints with 10 Asayish members in each checkpoint were set up. 105 Asayish offices provide security against ISIL on the frontlines across the region. Larger cities have general directorates that are responsible for all aspects of security including road controls. Each sub-region has a HAT command and each Asayish center organizes itself autonomously. Overall chief of the police is the former journalist Ciwan Ibrahim.

In the Jazira Region, the Asayish are further complemented by the Assyrian Sutoro police force, which is organized in every area with Christian population, and provides security and solutions to social problems in collaboration with other Asayish units. Though the Sutoro is officially subordinate to the Asayish, and represented on the Asayish executive board, it operates largely autonomous in regard to its internal affairs. Thus, it patrols the Christian neighborhoods of Qamishli without interference by the Asayish, and when the Sutoro members want to appoint someone, they don't need the approval of the Asayish. The Assyrian Khabour Guards and Nattoreh also provide security in towns along the Khabur River.

On 17 May 2017, the Raqqa Internal Security Forces were established for policing in Raqqa.

On 25 May 2017, a female branch of the Asayish was established in Al-Shaddadah.

On 4 July 2018, a conference of the Internal Security Forces took place in Raqqa. At the conference, two flags were adopted for the ISF; one saying only Internal Security Forces in Arabic, used in the Raqqa, Tabqa, Deir Ezzor, and Manbij regions, and one saying Asayish as well, used in the Jazira, Afrin, and Euphrates regions.

Strength, composition and budget 
The Asayish police has around 15,000 personnel: 10,000 in the Jazira Region, 3,000 in the Afrin Region, and 2,000 in the Euphrates Region. Ethnically, Kurds dominate the Asayish, though half of the active personnel in Jazira Region is Arab, while around 300 Turkmens have also enlisted, mostly in Tell Abyad. About 30% of the Asayish are women. Members of the force are paid $120 monthly salaries, which is above the average monthly salaries of Syrian civil servants, so that Asayish employment is rather attractive.

Involvement in military operations 
While Asayish is primarily a police, the forces of Asayish were involved in tensions against the National Defense Forces, a pro-government militia. The tensions led to the Battle of Hasakah, in August 2016. Ultimately, the Syrian Arab Army was forced to give up neighborhoods in the city. Following rising tensions in the city of Qamishli the Asayish and contingents of its HAT units were embroiled in further conflict with the National Defense Forces leading to the Battle of Qamishli, in April 2021.

In the course of the Raqqa campaign, the Asayish established the Raqqa Internal Security Forces.

Gender equality 

As with other institutions in the autonomous region, the Asayish are striving for a force based on gender equality. An estimated 25% of Asayish members are women, and the local Asayish forces are co-led by a man and woman. In addition to protecting civilians from armed attacks, the Asayish has created a special branch composed solely of women which is dedicated to gender-based violence, family disputes between women and protection of women during protests, and public celebrations. Their objective is to take care of every case in which a woman gets involved, from gender-based violence to a bank robbery.

Female members of the force face additional risk from attacks by radical Islamists. However, joining the Asayish is perceived as a huge act of personal and societal liberation from an extremely patriarchical background, for ethnic Kurdish and ethnic Arab women alike.

Citizen-led policing

Throughout the region, the municipal Civilian Defense Forces (HPC) and the regional Self-Defense Forces (HXP) also serve local-level security.

According to the pro-PYD Peace in Kurdistan Campaign, the region's government is working towards providing all citizens with Asayish training. The ultimate hope is that once the vast majority of citizens have been trained, security can be maintained amongst the citizens and the Asayish itself can be dissolved.

Training
In addition to the use of weapons, Asayish members are also trained in "mediation, ethics, the history of Kurdistan, imperialism, the psychological war waged by popular culture and the importance of education and self-critique."

See also
Raqqa Internal Security Forces - the security force in Raqqa
Sutoro – complementary Assyrian police force in the Jazira Region
Anti-Terror Units
Law enforcement in Syria

References

Anti-government factions of the Syrian civil war
Kurdish organisations
Politics of the Autonomous Administration of North and East Syria
Law enforcement in Syria
Organizations based in Syria
Gendarmerie